Uchtspringe is a railway station located in Uchtspringe, Germany. The station is located on the Berlin-Lehrte Railway. The train services are operated by Deutsche Bahn.

Train services
The station is serves by the following service(s):

Local services  Wolfsburg - Stendal

References

Railway stations in Saxony-Anhalt